There is a population of Japanese Americans and Japanese expatriates in Greater Seattle, whose origins date back to the second half of the 19th century. Prior to World War II, Seattle's Japanese community had grown to become the second largest Nihonmachi on the West Coast of North America.

History

Early years
Japan emerged from self-imposed isolation during the Meiji Restoration, and began to officially sponsor emigration programs in 1885. As a result, the period from the 1880s to the early 1900s brought a wave of Japanese immigration to the Seattle area. One early catalyst for this immigration was the Chinese Exclusion Act of 1882 which, along with a spate of anti-Chinese violence (culminating in the Seattle riot of 1886), led to the departure of nearly all Chinese from the Seattle area.  The departure of Chinese laborers opened the door for Japanese immigrants to fill the labor void.

In 1896, when the Nippon Yusen Kaisha steamers began traveling between Japan and Seattle, there were about 200 ethnic Japanese living in Seattle. By 1910, that population had grown to 5,000. The Japanese Consulate, which had  established an office in Tacoma in 1895, moved to Seattle in 1901.

Early Japanese immigrants consisted of mostly single males hoping to  amass a fortune before returning to Japan. Many of these men were younger sons from families who, due in large part to the Japanese practice of primogeniture, were motivated to establish themselves independently abroad.  These first generation Issei immigrants came primarily from small towns and rural areas in the southern Japanese prefectures of Hiroshima, Yamaguchi, Kumamoto, and Fukuoka, a pattern that continued up to the Asian immigration ban in 1924.

A majority of the men that came during this period found work in the surrounding canneries, railroads, and the massive logging industry around the Seattle area. These labor-intensive jobs did not provide the kind of rapid economic advancement they had planned on for their short three to five year stays. Because most of the initial Japanese immigrants during this period had only planned to stay temporarily, the early community was unstable with a ratio of 5 men to every woman and very little social, economic, or religious support.

Anti-Asian sentiment and legislation
Long before the events of World War II, Japanese immigrants to the Seattle area faced considerable racism, much tied to labor disputes that created a divide with the predominantly white population. These tensions were often inflamed by news outlets and politicians leading to petitions for Japanese exclusion and public demonstrations opposed to the import of Japanese labor. Community struggles were further exacerbated by the forced segregation and expulsions of Asian immigrants, who were unable to rent or purchase homes in West Seattle, Magnolia and other Seattle area neighborhoods.

The region's first anti-Japanese organization was formed in 1894, and succeeded in expelling many of the 400-500 Japanese laborers from the White River Valley area south of Seattle.  The Anti-Japanese League of Washington was formed in 1916 and campaigned in support of alien land laws in Washington.  By the early the 1920s, the Washington state legislature had succeeded in passing an alien land law that prohibited the Issei from owning land.  The constitutionality of this act was challenged, but ultimately upheld by the United States Supreme Court in the 1922 decision Yamashita v. Hinkle.

In 1907, the Gentlemen's Agreement between the governments of Japan and the U.S. ended the immigration of Japanese laborers, though it did allow the immigration of spouses and children of Japanese immigrants already in the United States.  Prior to 1908, around seven out of eight ethnic Japanese in the continental United States were men.  By 1924, due to the spousal immigration allowance, the ratio had changed to approximately four women to every six men. The Immigration Act of 1924 subsequently banned the immigration of all but a few token Japanese.

Community growth

Federal laws prohibiting Asian immigrants from naturalization, coupled with alien land laws and residential segregation barriers, made it difficult for ethnic Japanese to find housing for their families outside the central Seattle port area. Formidable occupational barriers also existed.  Both Issei and their Nisei descendants were unable to gain entry into trade unions, and jobs outside the immigrant community other than for menial and unskilled labor were rare even for college graduates.

Due in large part to these difficulties, many Japanese immigrants relied on their own communities for livelihood and support. They were successful in establishing a Nihonmachi, or Japantown, in the International District of Seattle and in downtown Tacoma by the 1900s. The Nihonmachi became the heart of the Japanese community with bathhouses, barbers, laundries, and entertainment. By 1919, there were more than 200 Japanese operated hotels in Seattle. A number of ethnic Japanese families were raised in Nihonmachi hotels and apartments, as well as in back rooms behind shop storefronts.   Over time, Seattle's Japantown became informally known as the area bounded by Yesler Way on the north, 4th Avenue on the west, Dearborn Street on the south, and 14th Avenue on the east.

In July 1902, the Seattle Japanese Language School was opened under the name of Nipponjinkai Juzoku Shogakko (Elementary School attached to the Japanese Association). The establishment of this school was followed by language schools opening in Fife in 1909 and another in Tacoma by 1911. The creation of these schools illustrated the desire of Japanese immigrants to pass on their language and culture to later generations.

Seattle's Japantown was a vibrant, bustling community by the early 1920s. The Immigration Act of 1924 and the Great Depression, however, had a dampening effect, leading to significant departures both to California and back to Japan. Nevertheless, as the second generation (known as Nisei) began to grow, the Japanese immigrants who had once planned to return to Japan after only a few years, had begun seeing themselves as settlers.  By the 1930s the ethnic Japanese population living in Seattle had reached 8,448, out of a total city population of 368,583 meaning that, "Japanese were Seattle’s largest non-white group, and the fourth-largest group behind several European nationalities." Prior to World War II, Seattle's  Nihonmachi had become the second largest Japantown on the West Coast of North America.

East of Lake Washington, Japanese immigrant labor helped clear recently logged land to make it suitable to support small scale farming on leased plots.  During the 20th century, the Japanese farming community became increasingly well established.  Prior to World War II, some 90 percent of the agricultural workforce on the "Eastside" was of Japanese ancestry.

World War II
Within days of the December 1941 Japanese attack on Pearl Harbor, the FBI began arresting Seattle area Japanese teachers, priests, and other community leaders.  Not long after, on February 19, 1942, President Franklin D. Roosevelt issued and signed Executive Order 9066, clearing the way for the mass incarceration of all persons of Japanese ancestry on the American West Coast in inland concentration camps.

Seattle's Japanese community received almost no active support during this time.  Among the few exceptions included University of Washington President Lee Paul Sieg, who took a leadership role in advocating for and facilitating the transfer of Nisei students to universities and colleges outside the West Coast to help them avoid being interned. In spite of his efforts, about 450 students were caught up in the oncoming internment and were forced to interrupt (often permanently) their education.  Walt and Milly Woodward of the Bainbridge Island Review were the only West Coast editors to openly criticize Executive Order 9066.  They would continue to advocate for members of the Bainbridge Island Japanese community during the war and help welcome them upon their eventual return. Tacoma mayor Harry P. Cain was one of only two elected officials on the West Coast to publicly oppose the government's internment of 110,000 Japanese Americans, in stark contrast to Washington congressional members Henry M. Jackson and Warren Magnuson.  Jackson in particular, strongly advocated for the removal and exclusion of ethnic Japanese from the Pacific Coast both during and even after the war.

By the end of March, 1942, all ethnic Japanese residents on Bainbridge Island had been removed and sent to the Manzanar camp in California.  Most of the remaining 9,600 Japanese Americans from the Seattle area were forced to live behind barbed wire in converted livestock stalls and parking lots on the Puyallup Valley Fair grounds for several months while the War Relocation Authority oversaw the construction of longer term concentration camps further inland. The temporary assembly center in Puyallup was given the name Camp Harmony.  Because of the internment, many members of the Japanese community permanently lost their businesses and residences. Most members of the Seattle area Japanese community that had been incarcerated at Camp Harmony were sent in groups by rail to the Minidoka Relocation Center in Idaho later in 1942, following the completion of that camp's construction.

As the war wound down, camp internees were allowed to return to the Pacific Coast, with those who chose to come back to Seattle staying in churches, other persons' residences, and the Seattle Japanese Language School building as they attempted to rebuild their lives. Seattle area residents who had been interned at Minidoka (sometimes referred to as "Hunt Camp") named their temporary home at the language school the "Hunt Hotel." Japanese exclusion groups flared up in the Seattle area in response to the return of the internees, but after encountering some community resistance, eventually disappeared.  Nevertheless, returning Japanese often encountered overt racism.  On the Eastside, only eleven families chose to return.  On Bainbridge Island, about half of the relocated Japanese community made the decision to come back, where they received a notably more positive reception than elsewhere on the West Coast.

Internment education and ceremonies
In 1978, the initial Day of Remembrance (observing the day that Executive Order 9066 was signed), was held at the former site of the Puyallup Assembly Center.  This was the site where more than 7,000 people of Japanese descent from Western Washington and Alaska were held before being transported to more permanent concentration camps further inland.

In 1981, Seattle was one of ten cities in which public hearings were held by the Commission on Wartime Relocation and Internment of Civilians, in which public testimonies were heard and recorded regarding the Japanese American internment.

The Nikkei Heritage Association of Washington started the "Omoide" education program to memorialize the incarceration of the Japanese people. In 2008 UW held an honorary graduation ceremony, The Long Journey Home, for the Japanese who had seen their studies cut short, with 200 former students, most of whom were in their 80s at the time, and family members of former students present. Tetsuden Kashima, an ethnic studies professor of the university, presented the degrees.

The Bainbridge Island Japanese American Exclusion Memorial, built in memory of Japanese Americans interned from Bainbridge Island, was completed and opened to the public in 2011.

Economy

Early Japanese settlers worked in coal mines, canneries of salmon products, railroad construction areas, and sawmills. Later, service industries and businesses opened within the Nihonmachi, often aided by the traditional cooperative financing approach known as tanomoshi.

By the 1920s farms owned or tended by ethnic Japanese families had produced about 75% of the produce and half of the milk generated in the Seattle area. This included farms in Bellevue and the White River valley. Seattle's Pike Place Market was the point of sale of much of the produce. By the start of World War I, Japanese truck farmers occupied about 70% of the market stalls.

Founded in 1928 in Tacoma, the Asian supermarket chain Uwajimaya closed during the Japanese American internment. It reopened in Seattle's International District following the end of World War II. Uwajimaya opened its first branch in Bellevue, Washington in 1978 and opened another branch in Renton, Washington in 2009.

First opening in 1904, Seattle's restaurant Maneki was built to resemble a three-story Japanese castle and could seat up to five hundred customers. It was at this elaborate structure that the future Japanese prime minister Takeo Miki once worked while supporting himself as a student. During World War II, when the ethnic Japanese community had been removed from the city, the castle-like building was looted and vandalized. Too badly damaged to be restored, the restaurant reopened after the war in its current location in Seattle's International District on a much more modest scale.

Seattle's Bush Garden restaurant was once considered a destination dining establishment, attracting visits from celebrities and politicians as well as locals. During the 1950s, its owners introduced tatami rooms in which diners could eat at floor level, but with a hidden pit where diners could extend their legs (a now not uncommon feature). In the 1970s, the restaurant became home to perhaps the first karaoke bar in the United States. A similar claim was made for Maneki.

Nintendo of America has been headquartered in Redmond, Washington since 1982.

Print media
Seattle's first Japanese newspaper, the Report, was issued in 1899 and remained in circulation until about 1904.

Founded in 1902 by first generation immigrants and investors Kiyoshi Kumamoto, Kuranosuke Hiraide, Juji Yadagai, and Ichiro Yamamoto, the North American Post became one of the region's main Japanese newspapers. Originally called Hokubei Jiji (The North American Times), it was the country's third Japanese American newspaper. Other daily Japanese papers in Seattle before World War II included Asahi Shinbun (launched in 1905) and Taihoku Nippo (The Great Northern Daily News, launched in 1910).

In 1928, James Sakamoto and his wife Misao founded the Japanese American Courier, the first Japanese American newspaper published entirely in English. Aimed specifically at the American-born Nisei, the Courier reported on Japanese affairs while encouraging its readers to assimilate into "Americanized" society.  The Courier was instrumental in promoting and organizing Nisei sporting events, publicizing and encouraging Nisei social groups, and helping establish the civil rights organization that would become known as the Japanese American Citizens League. By 1940, its circulation had grown to 4,275 readers.

Not long after the Japanese attack on Pearl Harbor, all Seattle area Japanese newspapers ceased publication. Once the war ended, as people were released from the camps, some Japanese-language media started to reappear.  In June 1946, the North American Post was revived, and its editor in chief was the same person (Sumio Arima) who published Hokubei Jiji before the war. Its publishers were the former editor of the Takoma Jijo, Sadahiko Ikoma, and Kunizo Maeno.

Education

Established in 1902, Seattle's Nihon Go Gakko (the Seattle Japanese Language School) is now operated by the Japanese Cultural & Community Center of Washington (JCCCW; ワシントン州日本文化会館 Washington-shū Nihon Bunka Kaikan). It is the continental United States's oldest Japanese language school. At its peak, prior to World War II, nearly 2,000 students attended the school, spending two hours there a day, five days a week following regular schooling.

A Japanese school was opened in Bellevue in 1918. Built in 1922, Tacoma's Nihon Go Gakko in the pre-World War II era served as Tacoma's Japanese language school.

Elementary schooling for Nisei children from Seattle's Nihonmachi primarily took place at Seattle's Main Street School and, later, Bailey Gatzert under the stewardship of its revered principal Ada Mahon, on up until World War II.

In the years preceding the American entry into World War II, Broadway High School on Seattle's Capitol Hill had the highest percentage of Japanese Americans of all Seattle high schools, with Nisei comprising about 25 percent of the student body in 1942. From 1938 to 1941, Japanese Americans had been valedictorians and salutatorians at the school. The removal of all ethnic Japanese students as part of the Japanese American Internment during World War II had a major impact on the school, and Broadway High School's final graduation ceremony took place only a few years later in 1946.

The Seattle Japanese School is a supplementary Japanese school, designated by the Japanese Ministry of Education (MEXT), which holds its classes in Bellevue.

Historic buildings and gardens
Founded before 1907, the Seattle Dojo is the oldest judo dojo in the United States. Members included Kenji Yamada, who won the 1954 and 1955 individual US National Judo championship titles, and helped the Seattle Dojo win first place in the team competition at the US Judo Nationals in 1955.

Built in 1909, the Nippon Kan Theatre was a former Japanese theater. It served as a de facto Japanese community center in Seattle prior to World War II. It was busy several nights a week with actors and musicians from Japan, movies, concerts, judo and kendo competitions, and community meetings. The building is now listed on the National Register of Historic Places.

Built in 1910, the Panama Hotel was essential to the Japanese community as it housed businesses, sleeping quarters for residents and visitors, restaurants, and one of several sentō (Japanese bathhouses) in Seattle during the early twentieth century.  The building was declared a National Historic Landmark in 2006, and in 2015 it was designated a National Treasure by the National Trust For Historic Preservation.

Started in 1927, Kubota Garden is a Japanese garden in the Rainier Beach neighborhood of Seattle, Washington.  

The Seattle Japanese Garden, completed in 1960, is located in the Madison Park neighborhood. During their October, 1960 stop in Seattle, the Japanese Crown Prince Akihito and Crown Princess Michiko visited the newly opened garden. Together, they planted a cherry tree and a white birch, the latter a symbol of the Princess's family. 

At the entrance to Seattle's Seward Park, in a wooded island filled with flowers between the circular entrance and exit road, is a taiko-gata stone lantern (tōrō) that was a gift of friendship from the City of Yokohama, Japan. It was given to the city in 1931 in gratitude to Seattle's assistance to Yokohama after the 1923 Great Kantō earthquake. Also near the entrance to Seward Park was a Japanese style wooden torii, originally built for Seattle's Potlatch festival in 1934. The wooden torii was later removed in the mid-1980s due to decay, and a replacement made with stone columns and timber cross beams was completed by 2021 and formally dedicated in 2022.

Religion
Built in 1941, the Seattle Betsuin Buddhist Temple (a Jōdo Shinshū temple) replaced an earlier Seattle Buddhist Church building (completed in 1908) that had been torn down as part of the Yesler Terrace project. Other Buddhist temples in the Seattle area include the Japanese Zen Buddhist temple Dai Bai Zan Cho Bo Zen Ji, which opened in 1983.

Tsubaki Grand Shrine of America, the first Shinto shrine built in the mainland United States after World War II, merged with Kannagara Jinja in 2001 and is located in Snohomish County's Granite Falls.

Culture and institutions

The Japanese American Citizens League, the oldest and largest Asian American civil rights organization in the United States, held its first national conference in 1930 in Seattle.

Founded in 1996, Densho is a nonprofit organization based in Seattle, Washington, which collects video oral histories and documents regarding Japanese American internment in the United States during World War II.

Kip Tokuda, who served as a representative in the Washington State Government, worked to build the Japanese Cultural and Community Center of Washington (JCCCW; ワ州日本文化会館 Wa-shū Nihon Bunka Kaikan) in 2003. The JCCCW dedicated to preserving, promoting and sharing Japanese and Japanese American history, heritage and culture.

The first recorded Bon Odori festival in Seattle was held in 1932. It's an annual event featuring food, cultural displays, and dancing, and is held along the street in front the Seattle Betsuin Buddhist Temple during the summer. Other long running Bon Odori festivals in the Puget Sound region include those held in Tacoma and the White River Valley.

The annual Seattle Cherry Blossom and Japanese Cultural Festival began in 1976 to commemorate the gift of 1,000 cherry trees given to Seattle by Japan's Prime Minister Takeo Miki. Miki had spent some of his student years at the University of Washington in the 1930s.

Since 1984, an annual floating lantern memorial dedicated to the victims of the atomic bombings of Hiroshima and Nagasaki and all other victims of war has been held at Seattle's Green Lake on August 6.

Geographic distribution

In 2010, 7,829 ethnic Japanese resided in the city of Seattle while a total of 20,652 ethnic Japanese resided in King County.

As of the year 2000, many ethnic Japanese in the Seattle area lived in the Eastside region. That year 70% of the employees of the members of the Japanese business association Shunjū (春秋) Club resided in that region, according to the organization's figures.

Notable residents
 Paul Chihara (born 1938), composer
 Masajiro Furuya (1862–1938), a banker, merchant, and manufacturer
 Gordon Hirabayashi (1918–2012), American sociologist, best known for the court case which bears his name, Hirabayashi v. United States.
 Taky Kimura (1924–2021), martial artist
 Kyo Koike (1878–1947), poet, physician, and founder of the Seattle Camera Club
 Fujitaro Kubota (1879–1973), gardener and philanthropist
 Aki Kurose (1925–1998), teacher and social-justice activist 
 Mich Matsudaira (1937–2019), a businessman and civil rights activist.
 Lori Matsukawa (born 1956), television news journalist
 Fujimatsu Moriguchi (1898–1962), businessman who founded Uwajimaya
 Tomio Moriguchi (born 1936), businessman and civil rights activist
 Shota Nakajima (born 1989), celebrity chef
 William K. Nakamura (1922–1944), soldier and Medal of Honor recipient
 Kenjiro Nomura (1896–1956), artist
 Apolo Ohno (born 1982), Olympic gold medalist in short track speed skating 
 Frank Okada (1931–2000), artist
 John Okada (1923–1971), author
 Yuji Okumoto (born 1959), actor
 James Sakamoto (1903–1955), pioneering journalist, and one of the founding members of the Japanese American Citizens League
 Bell M. Shimada (1922–1958), fisheries scientist
 Monica Sone (1919–2011), author whose autobiographical memoir describes her life as a Nisei in Seattle during the 1920s and 1930s, and at Minidoka
 Ichiro Suzuki (born 1973), ten time All-Star for the Seattle Mariners
 Kamekichi Tokita (1897–1948), painter and diarist
 Kip Tokuda  (1946–2013), Washington State representative
 George Tsutakawa (1910–1997), sculptor and painter
 Kenji Yamada (1924–2014), two-time U.S. National Judo champion
 Minoru Yamasaki (1913–1986), architect
 Takuji Yamashita (1874–1959), 1902 University of Washington Law School graduate and civil rights activist

See also

 Japanese Gulch

References

Further reading
 Fiset, Louis. Camp Harmony: Seattle's Japanese Americans and the Puyallup Assembly Center. University of Illinois Press, 2009. , 9780252076725. See entry - Google Books
 Lee, Shelley Sang-Hee. Claiming the Oriental Gateway: Prewar Seattle and Japanese America (Asian American History & Culture). Temple University Press, 2011. , 9781439902158.

 Shibazaki, Ryoichi. "Seattle and the Japanese—United States Baseball Connection, 1905-1926" (Master's Thesis). University of Washington, 1981.
 Takami, David. Divided Destiny: A History of Japanese Americans in Seattle. University of Washington Press, 1998.
 "Report on Designation Seattle Japanese Language School" (Archive). Seattle Landmarks Preservation Board.

External links
 Japanese Cultural & Community Center of Washington
 Japan-America Society of the State of Washington
 Map of Seattle Japantown
 The North American Post

History of Seattle
Seattle
 
Japanese-American history